Bo Bing may refer to:

 Bo Bing (academic) (1921-2013), Chinese professor of English
 Bo Bing (game), also known as Mooncake Festival Dice Game